Lipniak may refer to the following villages in Poland:
Lipniak, Gmina Kock in Lublin Voivodeship (east Poland)
Lipniak, Gmina Michów in Lublin Voivodeship (east Poland)
Lipniak, Lublin County in Lublin Voivodeship (east Poland)
Lipniak, Łuków County in Lublin Voivodeship (east Poland)
Lipniak, Parczew County in Lublin Voivodeship (east Poland)
Lipniak, Masovian Voivodeship (east-central Poland)
Lipniak, Warmian-Masurian Voivodeship (north Poland)
Lipniak, Gmina Suwałki in Podlaskie Voivodeship (north-east Poland)
Lipniak, Gmina Szypliszki in Podlaskie Voivodeship (north-east Poland)